The National Astrophysics and Space Science Programme (NASSP) is a South African space science research organization. The organization was founded in 2003.

The cosmologist Peter Dunsby was the founding Director of the NASSP for its first ten years.

See also 
 South African National Space Agency

References

External links 
 https://www.star.ac.za/

Scientific organizations established in 2003
Space agencies